Elliott Colón Blanco is a Puerto Rican politician who is the mayor of the city of Barranquitas.
He is affiliated with the statehood advocating Partido Nuevo Progresista or "PNP" political party of Puerto Rico.

See also
List of Puerto Ricans
Politics of Puerto Rico

References

Year of birth missing (living people)
21st-century Puerto Rican politicians
People from Barranquitas, Puerto Rico
Living people
Mayors of places in Puerto Rico